Butte Creek is tributary to the Sacramento River, joining the river in the vicinity of Colusa, California, United States. About  in length, it runs through much of Butte County, California (the county, however, receives its name from the Sutter Buttes in Sutter County, California). It travels through a spectacular mini-Grand Canyon as it reaches the Sacramento Valley floor, where it then flows somewhat south and west of the city of Chico towards the southwestern corner of the county.

Recent efforts have brought back Chinook salmon and steelhead runs to the stream.

There are several dams in its upper reaches. The PG&E has facilities at Centerville. The Paradise Irrigation District has Paradise Dam impounding Paradise Lake and the smaller Magalia Dam just beneath it on Little Butte Creek.

The creek was notable for the Honey Run Covered Bridge, which at 132 years old was the last remaining three-level covered bridge in the United States when it was destroyed on November 8, 2018 by the catastrophic Camp Fire.

The Colman Museum, headquartered in Chico, California, is dedicated to preserving the history and beauty of the Butte Creek canyon.
Whitewater kayaking on Butte Creek is popular, in part because of the outstanding scenery of the "Little Grand Canyon" section of the creek near Chico.

See also
List of rivers in California

References

External links
Paradise Irrigation District
Friends of the River
Honey Run Bridge
Colman Museum

Rivers of Butte County, California
Tributaries of the Sacramento River
Geography of the Sacramento Valley
Rivers of Northern California